Primorski Dolac is a municipality in Croatia in the Split-Dalmatia County. It has a population of 770 (2011 census), absolute majority of whom are Croats.

References

Populated places in Split-Dalmatia County
Municipalities of Croatia